Nishi Padma is a 1970 Bengali drama film written and directed by Arabinda Mukhopadhyay, based on a short story Hinger Kochuri by Bibhutibhushan Bandopadhyay, and starring Uttam Kumar and Sabitri Chatterjee as leads. The film had music by Nachiketa Ghosh, and went on to win two awards at the 1970 National Film Awards: Manna Dey won Best Male Playback Singer for "Ja Khushi Ora Bole", while Sandhya Mukherjee won the Best Female Playback Singer for "Ore Sakol Sona Molin Holo".

The film was remade into a Hindi film, Amar Prem (1972) directed by Shakti Samanta, with screenplay by Arabinda Mukhopadhyay, and starring Sharmila Tagore and Rajesh Khanna as leads.

Plot
Pushpa's (Sabitri Chatterjee) uncle forcefully sells her to a brothel in Calcutta. On her first night there, an unhappy married man named Ananda (Uttam Kumar) falls in love with her over her singing abilities and decides to visit her regularly.

Cast
 Uttam Kumar as Ananda
 Sabitri Chatterjee as Pushpa
 Anup Kumar
 Nripati Chattopadhyay
 Jahor Roy as Natabar
 Gita Dey
 Gangapada Basu
 Asha Devi
 Rajlakshmi Devi
 Premangshu Bose
 Master Molay

Soundtrack

Awards
 1970 National Film Awards
Best Male Playback Singer: Manna Dey -  "Ja Khushi Ora Bole"
 Best Female Playback Singer: Sandhya Mukherjee - "Ore Sakol Sona Molin Holo".

Reception
The film become all time blockbuster and ran for 126 days in theaters. Uttam Kumar give another fabulous performance. Even Rajesh Khanna became impressed and inspired on Uttam's performance. He wrote that he watched the film 24 times to copy him.

Remake
Shakti Samanta remade the film in Hindi in 1972 as Amar Prem, starring his regular stars Rajesh Khanna and Sharmila Tagore. That film also become successful and earned cult status.

References

External links
 

Indian drama films
Films based on short fiction
1970 drama films
1970 films
Bengali-language Indian films
Films scored by Nachiketa Ghosh
Bengali films remade in other languages
1970s Bengali-language films
Films based on works by Bibhutibhushan Bandyopadhyay